Hamilton Chamberlain Jones (September 26, 1884 – August 10, 1957) was a United States representative from North Carolina. He was born in Charlotte, North Carolina, and attended the schools of Charlotte, Central High School in Washington, D.C., and Horners Military School in Oxford, North Carolina. He graduated from the University of North Carolina at Chapel Hill in 1906 and Columbia Law School in 1907, having studied law at both institutions. At UNC he was a member of Sigma Alpha Epsilon fraternity.

Jones was admitted to the bar in 1906 and commenced practice in Charlotte in 1910, and also engaged in various agricultural pursuits. He was Judge of City Recorder's Court and Juvenile Court of Charlotte from 1913–1919, assistant United States district attorney for the western district of North Carolina from 1919–1921, and served in the State senate from 1925-1927. He was a trustee of the University of North Carolina, was elected as a Democrat to the Eightieth, Eighty-first, and Eighty-second Congresses (January 3, 1947 – January 3, 1953), but was an unsuccessful candidate for reelection in 1952 to the Eighty-third Congress. He resumed the practice of law, dying in Charlotte, North Carolina August 10, 1957. Jones was interred in Evergreen Cemetery.  His home at Charlotte, the Hamilton C. Jones III House, was listed on the National Register of Historic Places in 2002.

References

External links
 
 

|-

1884 births
1957 deaths
Politicians from Charlotte, North Carolina
American people of Welsh descent
Columbia Law School alumni
Democratic Party members of the United States House of Representatives from North Carolina
University of North Carolina at Chapel Hill alumni
Democratic Party North Carolina state senators
20th-century American politicians
Lawyers from Charlotte, North Carolina
20th-century American lawyers